Torrance, also spelled Torrence, is an originally Scottish surname. Torrance may also refer to:

Places
Torrance, California, United States
Torrance, East Dunbartonshire, Scotland
Torrance railway station
Torrance, Ontario, Canada
Torrance, Pennsylvania, United States
Torrance Barrens, a conservation area near Torrance, Ontario
Torrance County, New Mexico, United States

People

Given name
Street Symphony (producer), alias of Torrance Esmond, an American record producer and music executive
Torry Castellano (born 1979), nickname of Torrance Castellano, retired former drummer of the rock band, The Donnas
Torrance Coombs (born 1983), Canadian-American actor
Torrance Daniels (born 1981), former American football linebacker and current football coach
Torrance Gillick (1915–1971), Scottish footballer
Torrance Marshall (born 1977), American former footballer
Torrance Small (born 1970), former professional American football wide receiver
Torrance Watkins (born 1949), American equestrian and Olympic champion
Torrance Zellner (born 1970), American track and field athlete

Surname
Alex A. Torrance, Scottish curler
Alex F. Torrance, Scottish curler and coach
Alan Torrance (born 1956), Scottish theologian
Bill Torrance (born 1946), Scottish broadcaster
Bobby Torrance (born 1958), Scottish footballer
Chris Torrance (born 1941), British poet
David Torrance (disambiguation), various people with the name
Ellis Paul Torrance (1915–2003), American psychologist
George William Torrance (1835–1907), Irish composer
Iain Torrance (born 1949), Scottish theologian
Isobel Torrance Jr. (later in marriage Hannen) (born 1962), Scottish curler and coach
Jack Torrance (athlete) (1912–1969), American football player and shot putter
Jamaal Torrance (born 1983), American sprinter
Jared Sidney Torrance (1852–1921), American real estate developer
John Torrance (1786–1870), Scottish merchant and entrepreneur 
Robert Torrance (born 1939), American Professor Emeritus of literature
Russell Torrance, ABC Classic FM presenter and musician
Sam Torrance (born 1953), Scottish golfer
Sandy Torrance (1901–1941), Scottish footballer
Thomas Torrance (1871–1959), Scottish missionary to China
Thomas F. Torrance (1913–2007), Scottish theologian

Other uses
Torrance Shipman, fictional character in the film Bring It On, portrayed by Kirsten Dunst
Jack Torrance, fictional character in Stephen King's The Shining
Torrance (film), an upcoming American drama film

See also
Torrence, surname
Torrent (disambiguation)

English unisex given names